Głuszyna may refer to the following places:
Głuszyna, part of the Nowe Miasto district of Poznań
Głuszyna, Greater Poland Voivodeship (west-central Poland)
Głuszyna, Masovian Voivodeship (east-central Poland)
Głuszyna, Opole Voivodeship (south-west Poland)
Głuszyna, West Pomeranian Voivodeship (north-west Poland)